Cherrelle Garrett (born May 7, 1989) is an American bobsledder. At the FIBT World Championships 2015 Garrett, together with pilot Elana Meyers beat three German crews to win the first world championship title in women's bobsled for the United States.

References

External links
 
 Biography at the United States Olympic Committee

1989 births
Living people
American female bobsledders
21st-century American women